Su Ziwei (born December 9, 1984, in Harbin, Heilongjiang) is a Chinese female ice hockey player. She competed for China at the 2010 Winter Olympics. The team finished 7th out of 8 teams.

References

1984 births
Living people
Chinese women's ice hockey players
Ice hockey players at the 2010 Winter Olympics
Olympic ice hockey players of China
Sportspeople from Harbin
Asian Games medalists in ice hockey
Asian Games bronze medalists for China
Medalists at the 2003 Asian Winter Games
Medalists at the 2007 Asian Winter Games
Ice hockey players at the 2003 Asian Winter Games
Ice hockey players at the 2007 Asian Winter Games